Widelands is a free and open-source, slow-paced real-time strategy video game under the GNU General Public License. Widelands takes many ideas from and is quite similar to The Settlers and The Settlers II. It remains a work-in-progress game, with development still required in graphics and bug-fixing. The game runs on several operating systems such as AmigaOS 4, Linux, BSD, Mac OS X, and Windows.

Gameplay
Widelands has single-player, local network and internet multiplayer modes, single-player campaign missions, and an internationalisation system with translations for British English, Bulgarian, Catalan, Czech, Danish, Dutch, Finnish, French, German, Hungarian, Italian, Japanese, Korean, Low German, Polish, Portuguese, Russian, Scottish Gaelic, Slovak, Spanish, and Swedish. Players may select one of five different tribes: the human-like "Empire", the "Barbarians", the "Atlanteans", the "Frisians", and the "Amazons".

The game provides four basic tutorials and four tutorial campaigns. Advanced players can create their own maps with the included map editor. It is also possible to import and play original Settlers II maps.

Development
The first version of Widelands was published in August 2002. Widelands 1.0, the first stable version, was released 19 years later in June 2021. The latest release of Widelands as of October 2022 is version 1.1.

Reception
The game was reviewed by Linux Journal which noted: 
The German LinuxUser magazine reviewed Widelands in issue 4/2008 in a three A4-paged article.

The German c’t magazin wrote a short review of Widelands in their 4/2008 issue and included a Windows version of Widelands Build 11 on their magazin DVD.

The French free software website Framasoft remarked: 

Widelands was selected in September 2010 as "HotPick" by Linux Format magazine.

In 2022 the Slovenian magazine Jazbina briefly reviewed Widelands in a Settlers retrospective, describing it as "another unfinished free alternative, but one that is friendly, ambitious and maverick".

See also

 List of open-source games

References

External links

Official Widelands page
Widelands project page on GitHub

Amiga games
AmigaOS 4 games
Free software programmed in C++
Fangames
Strategy video games
Linux games
MacOS games
Open-source video games
Real-time strategy video games
Unix games
Windows games
Lua (programming language)-scripted video games